Julianne Smith is an American foreign policy advisor and diplomat who serves as the United States Permanent Representative to NATO in the Biden administration. She previously served as deputy national security advisor to then-Vice President Biden in the Obama administration.

Education 
Smith earned a Bachelor of Arts in communications and French from Xavier University and a Master of Arts in international relations from American University. She also studied French at the University of Paris, Sorbonne for a year and German at the Ludwig Maximilian University of Munich for one year.

Career

NGO experience
From 2000 to 2003, Smith worked as a program officer at the German Marshall Fund. She then joined the Center for Strategic and International Studies as a senior fellow, where among other accomplishments in November 2006 she edited Transforming NATO (...again) - A Primer for the NATO Summit in Riga 2006, and in 2008 she published The NATO-Russia Relationship: Defining Moment or Déjà Vu?.

Obama administration
From 2009 to 2012, she served as the director of European and NATO policy at the United States Department of Defense, where she co-wrote the 2010 NATO Strategic Concept document, under Secretaries Robert Gates and Hillary Clinton.

From April 2012 to June 2013, she served as deputy national security advisor to then-Vice President Joe Biden.

Later NGO experience
From 2014 to 2018, she worked at the Center for a New American Security. She was also a fellow at the Robert Bosch Stiftung for one year. A senior advisor post at WestExec Advisors followed the consultancy's formation in 2017.

Smith co-founded the Leadership Council for Women in National Security, which officially launched on 25 June 2019.

She worked as an advisor to a German consultancy called Berlin Global Advisors and worked at the American Academy in Berlin, while she penned such essays in foreign policy magazines as "NATO in the Age of Trump".

A 2021 investigation in The American Prospect found that Smith, "who listed Boeing and SoftBank as clients, earned $34,000 as a WestExec consultant while holding down a full-time role at the think tank German Marshall Fund."

Biden administration
In January 2021, Smith became a senior advisor to the United States secretary of state.

Representative to NATO
On June 15, 2021, President Joe Biden nominated Smith to serve as the United States permanent representative to NATO. On September 15, 2021, a hearing on her nomination was held before the Senate Foreign Relations Committee. On October 19, 2021, her nomination was reported favorably out of committee. Her nomination was confirmed by United States Senate on November 18, 2021 by voice vote.

Punditry career
Smith has written op-ed columns for The New York Times, Lawfare, Washington Monthly, Foreign Affairs, and The National Interest. She has also appeared on NPR programs, including 1A, All Things Considered, and Morning Edition.

Personal life 
Smith and her husband have two sons. She speaks German and French.

References

External links

Living people
American University alumni
Biden administration personnel
Obama administration personnel
Permanent Representatives of the United States to NATO
Xavier University alumni
Year of birth missing (living people)
Recipients of the Cross of the Order of Merit of the Federal Republic of Germany
American women diplomats